Material Girls: Why Reality Matters for Feminism is a 2021 book by Kathleen Stock which explores issues related to transgender individuals. The book reached number 13 on the UK list of best selling non-fiction charts.

Summary 

In this book Stock defends the idea that biological sex is real. She disagrees with the idea that sex is a continuum. She argues that lobbying groups such as Stonewall are responsible for the influence of trans ideas. Stock argues that individuals with penises should be excluded from certain female-only spaces. Stock argues that trans identities should be viewed as a legal fiction analogous to how a company is treated as a person in law.

Reception 
Reviewing in The Times, Emma Duncan says the book is an easy read and helped her understand trans issues better. In The Telegraph, Jane O'Grady describes the book as brave, enligtening and closely argued. Julie Bindel writing in The Spectator says that the book was meticulously researched and carefully argued.

Gaby Hinsliff reviewed the book in The Guardian together with Helen Joyce's book Trans: When Ideology Meets Reality. Hinsliff said that Stock's book used a cooler lens than Joyce's and is focused on abstract concepts rather than personal stories.

Reviewing in The Philosophers' Magazine, Julian Baggini comments that Stock's work is not the last word on the debate but a legitimate contribution, arguing that it is far from obvious that  gender self-identification is the only legitimate criteria for identifying as a sex or gender and that those who do not accept this position should be taken seriously. 

Bindel says that Stock incorrectly conflates feminists with gender critical activists, and that Stock's critique of standpoint epistemology, while valid, do not distinguish second wave feminist idea of the personal is political which focuses on connecting individual experiences to social forces rather than privileging these experiences epistemically. Philosopher Adam Briggle, writing in the Social Epistemology Review and Reply Collective argues that the concepts that Stock chooses to use derive from the author's own notions of risk trade offs and that she has failed to analytically assess these tradeoffs, which should be done with reference to politics.

References 

Transgender non-fiction books
English-language books
2021 non-fiction books